The Fairchild Corporation is the successor corporation of Fairchild Industries, Inc. In March 2009, the company filed for Chapter 11 bankruptcy protection.
Banner Aerospace was one of the company's major subsidiaries.

It was subsequently renamed Alcoa Fasteners.

Jeffrey Steiner was the company's CEO until his resignation in October 2008; he died a month later. , the firm has been delisted from the New York Stock Exchange; a number of executives had recently left the company's senior management team, including Steiner's son, Eric; and the firm was being run by interim chief executive Phillip Sassower, the head of a New York private equity firm that is Fairchild's largest shareholder.

References

External links